Gilbert Percy Whitley (9 June 1903 – 18 July 1975) was a British-born Australian ichthyologist and malacologist who was Curator of Fishes at the Australian Museum in Sydney for about 40 years. He was born at Swaythling, Southampton, England, and was educated at King Edward VI School, Southampton and the Royal Naval College, Osborne.

Whitley migrated with his family to Sydney in 1921 and he joined the staff of the Australian Museum in 1922 while studying zoology at Sydney Technical College and the University of Sydney. In 1925 he was formally appointed Ichthyologist (later Curator of Fishes) at the Museum, a position he held until retirement in 1964. During his term of office he doubled the size of the ichthyological collection to 37,000 specimens through many collecting expeditions.

Whitley was also a major force in the Royal Zoological Society of New South Wales, of which he was made a Fellow in 1934 and where he served as president during 1940–41, 1959–60 and 1973–74. He also edited its publications from 1947 to 1971.

He died in Sydney in 1975.

His zoological author abbreviation was Whitley.

Awards and honours
1967 – Awarded the Australian Natural History Medallion by the Field Naturalists Club of Victoria
1970 – Awarded the W.B. Clarke Medal by the Royal Society of New South Wales
1979 – Commemorated by the establishment, by the Royal Zoological Society of New South Wales, of the Whitley Awards for excellence in zoological publications relating to the fauna of the Australasian region.

Taxon named in his honor 
Diaphus whitleyi, Fowler, 1934 is a species of lanternfish found in the Philippines and the Western Central Pacific Ocean.

Taxon described by him
See :Category:Taxa named by Gilbert Percy Whitley

Publications

References

Murray, Maree; & Roach, John. (2002). Whitley, Gilbert Percy (1903–1975). Australian Dictionary of Biography, Volume 16. Melbourne University Press.

Australian ichthyologists
Australian zoologists
Australian malacologists
1903 births
1975 deaths
Australian curators
People educated at King Edward VI School, Southampton
20th-century British zoologists
British emigrants to Australia